Brie Larson is an American actress and filmmaker. Her first screen appearance was in a comedy sketch at age eight in a 1999 episode of The Tonight Show with Jay Leno. Following several television appearances, including as a main cast member in the short-lived sitcom Raising Dad (2001), Larson played minor roles in the 2004 comedy films Sleepover and 13 Going on 30. In 2005, she released a studio album named Finally Out of P.E., in which her single “She Said” peaked at number 31 on the Billboard Hot Singles Sales chart.

Larson's first major film role was in the teen comedy Hoot (2006) and she went on to gain wider recognition for playing the daughter of Toni Collette's character in the Showtime comedy-drama series United States of Tara (2009–2011). She took on supporting roles of the love interest in the comedies Scott Pilgrim vs. the World (2010) and 21 Jump Street (2012), and played the troubled daughter of Woody Harrelson's character in the drama Rampart (2011). Her breakthrough came in 2013 when she starred as the distraught supervisor of a foster-care home in Destin Daniel Cretton's independent drama Short Term 12. Larson also expanded into filmmaking by co-writing and co-directing the short films The Arm (2012) and Weighting (2013).

Following more supporting roles in the romance The Spectacular Now (2013) and the comedy Trainwreck (2015), Larson won the Academy Award for Best Actress for playing a young mother held in captivity in the independent drama Room (2015). In 2017, she starred as a photojournalist in the adventure film Kong: Skull Island, which grossed over $560 million worldwide, received critical acclaim for her portrayal of Jeannette Walls in The Glass Castle, and made her solo directorial debut with the coming of age comedy film Unicorn Store, in which she also starred. Larson went on to play Carol Danvers in Captain Marvel and Avengers: Endgame, both 2019 superhero films set in the Marvel Cinematic Universe. Both films rank as the top-grossing films of 2019; the former is the first female-led superhero film to earn over $1 billion and the latter is the second highest-grossing film of all time.

Film

Television

Video game

Theatre

Theme park attractions

Music videos

Discography

Albums

As primary artist

Other credits

Singles

Other appearances

Music videos

As lead artist

See also
 List of awards and nominations received by Brie Larson
 List of female film and television directors

References

External links
 

Actress filmographies
American filmographies